Bat Cave is a small cave in the Caribbean Island of St. Lucia on the Western Coast.

The cave is a local landmark for boats organising snorkel trips for tourists.

Despite its name, the cave is not believed to contain a large bat population.

References

Natural history of Saint Lucia
Caves of Saint Lucia
Caves of the Caribbean